This is a list of National Football League (NFL) quarterbacks who have started in the Super Bowl.

Winning and losing quarterbacks

Quarterbacks with multiple Super Bowl starts

Super Bowl wins are often used to determine the greatness of a quarterback. Of the eligible players, only Jim Plunkett has won multiple Super Bowls and not been inducted into the Hall of Fame. Peyton Manning and Tom Brady are the only starting quarterbacks to have won Super Bowls for two NFL teams, while Craig Morton and Kurt Warner are the only other quarterbacks to have started for a second team.  Jim McMahon won a second Super Bowl ring having been a backup on the Brett Favre-led Green Bay Packers team that won Super Bowl XXXI.

Notes
 BOLD formatting indicates that the game was won.
 Starr was 3–1 in NFL Championship games (1960, 1961, 1962, and 1965) played before the NFL and AFL met in the first Super Bowl.
 Dawson was 1–0 in an AFL Championship game (1962) played before the NFL and AFL first met in the Super Bowl.
 Three pairs of quarterbacks faced off twice in the Super Bowl: Staubach and Bradshaw, Aikman and Kelly, and Brady and Eli Manning. In each case the same quarterback (Bradshaw, Aikman, and Manning) won both matches.

See also

 List of Super Bowl champions
 List of Super Bowl MVPs
 List of Super Bowl head coaches
 List of National Football League quarterback playoff records

References

Quarterbacks with multiple Super Bowl Starts
Super Bowl